Tilang is a raga in Indian classical music, that belongs to the Khamaj Thaat.

Scale 
 Arohana (ascending scale): 
 Avarohana (descending scale): 

This raga has a Ni flat (ni komal) in the descent.

Its defining characteristics are: PS'NS'nP, PS'NS'PnP; some ragis add a R (S*R*NS*PnP).

Vadi and samvadi 
 Vadi note: Ga
 Samvadi : Ni

In Carnatic music 
This raga originated in Hindustani classical music and has been taken into Carnatic music. It is derived from the 28th Melakarta (parent scale) Harikambhoji. It is an audava-audava raga (pentatonic asymmetrical scale) with the following structure.
 Arohana: 
 Avarohana:

Compositions 
Shree Ganesha charanam composed by Papanasam Sivan is a popular composition set in this ragam.

Ramakrishnaru Manege, Tarakka Bindige By Purandara Dasa
Satyavantara Sangaviralu By Kanaka Dasa

Film songs

Tamil

Scale similarities 
 Gambhiranata raga is a symmetrical raga with N3 (Kakali nishadha) in both ascending and descending scales, while Tilang uses Kaisiki nishada (N2) in descending scale.
 Savitri raga is a symmetrical raga with N2 (Kaisiki nishadha) in both ascending and descending scales, while Tilang uses Kakali nishada (N3) in ascending scale.

Hence, Tilang has arohana of Gambhiranata, and avarohana of Savitri.

Notes

References 

Janya ragas
Ragas